The Kozak ( (Kozak), Ukrainian for Cossack) is a Ukrainian family of armored personnel carriers with a V-hull intended to transport personnel and various loads.

Production 
The first Kozak vehicle (also known as Kozak-1) first appeared on August 24, 2009 at the Independence Day of Ukraine military parade in Kyiv.

Only two vehicles were manufactured prior to March 2014.

The third vehicle (also known as "Kozak-2014") was built in November 2014 and was intended to be a proof of concept to address a growing requirement for a mobile MRAP. In March 2015 the vehicle was armed with the NSV machine gun.

Another variant, the Kozak-2, was built in 2015 and armed with an anti-tank guided missile system. In May 2015 the vehicle appeared at the 169th Training Centre.

The Ukrainian Defense Ministry conducted comparative tests of 11 armored vehicles from various manufacturers in early 2016, but only three of them, including the Kozak-2, passed the state tests, the Ministry said. The trials of the Kozak-2M1, an improved tactical version of the Kozak-2, continued from October 2018 to July 2019, during which time the vehicle was tested with over 50 techniques and in a simulated combat environment.

The Defense Minister of Ukraine Stepan Poltorak on March 21, 2017 signed a decree officially adopting the "Kozak-2” into service.

Variants

 SRM-1 "Kozak-" - Light armored vehicle based on the Iveco Daily 55S18W 4x4 chassis
 "Kozak-001" - The first production batch of the Kozak-2, adopted by the National Guard.
 "Kozak-2" - Multipurpose armored vehicle combining durability and high operational payload with dynamic mobility and mine resistance. Based on the Iveco Eurocargo 4×4 truck chassis. 
 "Kozak-2M1" - An improved version of the Kozak-2, intended to be used as a tactical combat vehicle.
 "Kozak-4" - A light armoured utility vehicle based on the Iveco Daily chassis.
 "Kozak-5" - A special operations vehicle for police and special forces, based on the commercially available Ford F550 chassis with the 6.7L engine, specially modified using the official Ford “DBL Design” conversion.

Operators

 
  – captured several dozen vehicles during the 2022 invasion of Ukraine.
 
 State Border Guard Service of Ukraine – received one "Kozak-2" on January 19, 2015. The second "Kozak-2" vehicle was received by the Border Guard Service on May 28, 2015. There were further deliveries.
 National Guard of Ukraine – received ten "Kozak-001" vehicles on July 6, 2015. There were further deliveries.
 Ukrainian Armed Forces

References

External links

 Kozak-I (2009) on the Manufacturer's website
 Kozak-II (2014) on the Manufacturer's website
 Kozak-II (2015) on the Manufacturer's website

Armoured personnel carriers of Ukraine
Armoured cars
Military light utility vehicles
Wheeled armoured personnel carriers
Military vehicles introduced in the 2000s
Armoured personnel carriers of the post–Cold War period